The Thomas James Cotton House is a historic house at 405 South Third Street in Dardanelle, Arkansas.  It is a -story wood-frame structure, built in 1898 and extensively remodeled in 1916 to give it its present Craftsman appearance.  It has a side-gable roof, with exposed rafter ends, which extends over a shallow front porch supported by unusually wide square columns.  A wide clipped-gable dormer projects from the front roof face, with a band of casement windows flanked by shutters.

The house was listed on the National Register of Historic Places in 2001.

See also
National Register of Historic Places listings in Yell County, Arkansas

References

Houses on the National Register of Historic Places in Arkansas
National Register of Historic Places in Yell County, Arkansas
Houses completed in 1898
1898 establishments in Arkansas
Houses in Yell County, Arkansas
Bungalow architecture in Arkansas
American Craftsman architecture in Arkansas
Dardanelle, Arkansas